The 11089 / 90 Bhagat Ki Kothi–Pune Express is an Express train belonging to Indian Railways – Central Railway zone that runs between  and  in India. It is currently being operated with 11089/11090 train numbers on a weekly basis.

It operates as train number 11089 from Bhagat Ki Kothi to Pune Junction and as train number 11090 in the reverse direction, serving the states of Rajasthan, Gujarat & Maharashtra.

Coach composition

The train has standard ICF rakes with max speed of 110 kmph. The train consists of 22 coaches:

 1 AC First Class
 1 AC II Tier
 6 AC III Tier
 10 Sleeper Coaches
 2 General Unreserved
 2 Seating cum Luggage Rake

As is customary with most train services in India, coach composition may be amended at the discretion of Indian Railways depending on demand.

Service

11089/ Bhagat Ki Kothi–Pune Express has an average speed of 46 km/hr and covers 1078 km in 23 hrs 10 mins.

11090/ Pune–Bhagat Ki Kothi Express has an average speed of 50 km/hr and covers 1078 km in 21 hrs 20 mins.

Route and halts

The important halts of the train are:

Schedule

Rake sharing

The train shares its rake with:

 11087/11088 Veraval–Pune Express
 11091/11092 Bhuj–Pune Express
 11095/11096 Ahimsa Express
 12103/12104 Pune–Lucknow Superfast Express

Traction

Both trains are hauled by a Vatva Loco Shed-based WDM-3A from Bhagat Ki Kothi to Ahmedabad and from Ahmedabad it is hauled by a Vadodara Loco Shed-based WAP-5 or WAP-4E electric locomotive up til Pune.

References

External links
11089 Bhagat Ki Kothi - Pune Junction Express at India Rail Info
11090 Pune - Bhagat Ki Kothi Junction Express at India Rail Info

Express trains in India
Transport in Jodhpur
Rail transport in Rajasthan
Rail transport in Gujarat
Rail transport in Maharashtra
Transport in Pune